Kulappully (also written as Kulappulli), located in the Palakkad District, state of Kerala, India., is a suburb of Shoranur municipality.

Politics
Kulappully falls under the Shornur assembly constituency, and the Palakkad parliament constituency.

See also
Kulappulli Leela
Valluvanad
Shoranur

References

Cities and towns in Palakkad district